is a vocational school in Seki, Gifu Prefecture, Japan. It is one of the largest colleges in the aviation field in Japan. It is run by the education foundation, Jinno Institute (神野学園).

History 

It opened in 1970 in Konan and moved its campus to Seki in 1982.

Departments

Aviation Maintenance Engineering (three-year program)
Aircraft Production Engineering (three-year program)
Airport Service (two-year program)

External links
 Official website 
 Official Jinno Institute website

References

Educational institutions established in 1970
Private universities and colleges in Japan
Universities and colleges in Gifu Prefecture
Engineering universities and colleges in Japan